Heather Lewis (1962–2002) was an American writer.

Biography
Heather Lewis was born in Bedford, New York. She attended Sarah Lawrence College.

She was the author of three published novels. The first, House Rules (1994), details the experiences of a fifteen-year-old girl working as a show rider of horses—an experience the author herself had in her teenage years. The novel won the 1995 Ferro-Grumley Award for Lesbian Fiction. Lewis's second novel, The Second Suspect (1998), follows the struggles of a female police investigator trying to prove the guilt of a powerful and influential businessman responsible for the rape and murder of several young women. The third, posthumously published novel, Notice (2004), describes the experiences of a young prostitute, Nina and her involvement with a sadist and his wife. Lewis' former teacher, Allan Gurganus wrote an afterword for Notice. An out lesbian, her works explore aspects of American culture, such as the connections between power, drugs, sex, violence, love and justice.

Lewis taught at the Writer's Voice and contributed to various anthologies of literature including Best Lesbian Erotica (1996, 1997), Once Upon a Time: Erotic Fairy Tales for Women (1996), and A Woman Like That: Lesbian and Bisexual Writers Tell Their Coming Out Stories (1999). Lewis returned to New York in the fall of 2001, after a year in Arizona. She ended her life in May 2002, in New York.

References 

1962 births
2002 suicides
20th-century American novelists
American women novelists
American lesbian writers
American LGBT novelists
LGBT people from New York (state)
20th-century American women writers
Sarah Lawrence College alumni
20th-century American LGBT people